Daniel Tracey (probably 1794 – July 18, 1832) born in Roscrea, Tipperary County, Ireland, was a doctor, journalist and Canadian politician.

He arrived in the Province of Lower Canada (today Quebec) with his younger siblings in 1825. Though he had trained (and probably practiced) as a doctor in Dublin he was never registered to practice in Lower Canada.

The Vindicator

In 1828, he began publishing the Irish Vindicator and Canada General Advertiser, known simply as the Irish Vindicator. Based in Montreal the newspaper aimed at the immigrant Irish community soon took a dissenting view of the non-elected but powerful, autocratic Family Compact, known in Lower Canada as the Château Clique and advocated the enrichment of the democratic rights for the majority of its citizens, most of whom were Catholics. The paper also promoted what Daniel O’Connell Louis-Joseph Papineau.

Tracey was one of several journalists imprisoned early in 1832 for criticizing the non-elected legislative council that represented the interests of the Château Clique. Tracey, editor of the Vindicator and Ludger Duvernay, the editor of the French language La Minerve newspaper were arrested for libel and imprisoned together for over a month for writing articles that said that "it is certain that before long all of America must be republican." They were released after much public support and condemnation of the arrests.

Political career

In the spring of 1832, he was elected as a member of the Legislative Assembly of Lower Canada. At the vote counting station supporters of the opponent candidate, Stanley Bagg (supported by the Clique) triggered a violent confrontation. As a result, three of Tracey's supporters were killed and many more were wounded. Thomas D'Arcy McGee, one of the Canadian fathers of confederation, would hold the same Legislative seat in 1857.

Death

Despite his rising political stature he died suddenly in July, 1832 becoming a victim of the widespread cholera outbreak that summer in Montreal. After his death, Edmund Bailey O'Callaghan took over as editor of the Vindicator.

External links 
 

 Daniel Tracey and family of Roscrea Montreal and Albany link
 Mullally, Emmett J. Dr Daniel Tracey, a pioneer worker for responsible government in Canada

References 

1794 births
1832 deaths
19th-century Irish people
Irish emigrants to pre-Confederation Quebec
19th-century newspaper publishers (people)
Canadian newspaper publishers (people)
Members of the Legislative Assembly of Lower Canada
Canadian republicans
People from County Tipperary
Politicians from County Tipperary
Quebec people of Irish descent
Irish expatriates in Canada
People from Roscrea
Immigrants to Lower Canada